Catherwood is a name. Notable people with the name include:

People with this surname
Andrea Catherwood (born 1967), Northern Ireland news presenter
Christopher Catherwood (contemporary), British author
David Catherwood (born 1956), Irish composer and orchestra conductor
Earl Catherwood (1900–1988), Canadian politician (in Ontario)
Emma Catherwood (born 1981), Welsh actress
Ethel Catherwood (1908–87), Canadian Olympic track and field athlete
Sir Fred Catherwood (1925–2014), British politician; member of the European Parliament 1974–94
Frederick Catherwood (1799–1854), English artist and architect
John Alexander Catherwood (1857–1940), Canadian politician (in British Columbia)
John Hugh Catherwood (1888–1930), U.S. Navy seaman
Mary Hartwell Catherwood (1847–1902), American author
Michael Catherwood (born 1979), American radio personality
Sarah Catherwood (born 1980), Olympic swimmer from New Zealand

People with this given name
 Catherwood Learmonth (1896-1981), British legal administrator

See also
 Martin P. Catherwood Library
 Jay Catherwood Hormel